Roadmender (also Northampton Roadmender or the Roadmender Centre) is a live music venue in Lady's Lane, Northampton, England. Set in a former school building, the venue has left an indelible print on generations of the town's teenagers as the only major live venue in the town and the most recognised indie club remaining in regular operation following the closure of Bass Clef in 1999 and the Irish Centre in 1997.

History
The Roadmender started life as a youth club built in an entirely different location to the one on which it operates today. Named after the 1902 book by Michael Fairless, the club was established to cater for the "no-collar" bits and girls of the Boroughs area of Northampton. Jill Harrold wrote:

In the 1980s The Roadmender hosted a community arts programme that included printing, textiles, music and theatre activities on offer primarily for those same disadvantaged young people for which The Roadmender was established in the first place.

The Roadmender was the preeminent music/arts centre in Northamptonshire from the early 1980s to the late 1990s. The largest venue for touring bands between London and Birmingham, the Roadmender was an essential stop for the likes of Radiohead, Metallica, Oasis, Travis and the Manic Street Preachers until the refurbishment in 1999/2000 reduced the capacity of its main hall from 1000 to 850.

Formerly a county council funded arts centre with a remit for arts, dance, live and recorded music; The Roadmender has had a varied history facing closure and bankruptcy several times during a long and complicated history.

Its most recent closure occurred in late 2005 when it lost several hundred thousand pounds of council funding which forced its then owners Roadmender Ltd into liquidation. After several failed rescue attempts the brand and building were sold to Purplehaus, the owners of a nearby nightclub The Soundhaus, who rebranded it New Roadmender. Notable performances since its reopening have included Idlewild, The Maccabees, Marillion, Kate Nash, Biffy Clyro, Finch,  We Are Scientists, Little Boots (supported by Ellie Goulding), Deftones, Enter Shikari, Happy Mondays, The Dead South and the NME tour.

Senegalese musician Youssou N'Dour played the Roadmender on 18 December 2002.

References

External links
Roadmender website

Nightclubs in England
Buildings and structures in Northampton